Serkan Kırıntılı (born 15 February 1985) is a Turkish professional footballer who plays as a goalkeeper for Turkish Süper Lig club Ümraniyespor.

Club career
On 21 October 2019, Kırıntılı received the fastest ever red card given to a player in Turkish football history, having grabbed the ball with his hands outside the box just 13 seconds into the game against Yeni Malatyaspor.

International career
A youth international for Turkey, Kırıntılı was called up to the Turkey national football team in 2018 at the age of 33. He debuted for Turkey in a 2–1 friendly win over Iran on 28 May 2018.

Honours
Fenerbahçe
Süper Lig: 2010–11
Turkish Cup: 2011–12, 2012–13

Konyaspor
Turkish Cup: 2016–17
Turkish Super Cup: 2017

References

External links
Player profil on TFF.org tff.org 
 
 

1985 births
Living people
People from Karataş
Turkish footballers
Turkey international footballers
Turkey under-21 international footballers
Turkey youth international footballers
Association football goalkeepers
Süper Lig players
Adanaspor footballers
MKE Ankaragücü footballers
Fenerbahçe S.K. footballers
Çaykur Rizespor footballers
Konyaspor footballers
Alanyaspor footballers
Ümraniyespor footballers